Wien Mitte is a rail and U-Bahn station in Vienna, close to the city centre. It is the city terminus of Vienna's City Airport Train (CAT), which provides non-stop service to Vienna International Airport. The station is a major hub for S-Bahn suburban trains, with little service by InterCity trains. The station is connected to the Mitte / Landstraße U-Bahn station.

History

The first station to occupy this site was called Hauptzollamt and opened in 1859. It was rebuilt between 1899 and 1901 to connect with the Stadtbahn, which ran below ground. When the S-Bahn opened in 1962, this station was renamed Landstraße, which remains the name of the U-Bahn portion. The main portion of the station was renamed Wien Mitte after it became a stop for international trains in 1975 due to construction at the Wien Franz-Josefs-Bahnhof. In 1999, a proposal for the new Wien Mitte station building, which was to include two new high-rise buildings up to 97 metres, drew massive controversy from many Viennese residents as well as UNESCO, who questioned whether said proposal was compatible with the World Heritage Site status of the neighbouring Old Town. The project in question was dropped in 2003, and a newer, heavily downsized project, which became the present station building and shopping centre, was constructed between 2007 and 2013. The U-Bahn uses the facilities of the former S-Bahn station.

City Airport Train
The City Airport Train's city terminus is located at Wien Mitte. The CAT terminal houses self-service kiosks, staffed check-in desks and baggage drops exclusively for CAT passengers. The journey to the airport via CAT takes 16 minutes.

Services

 Wien Meidling - Wien Hauptbahnhof - Wien Mitte - Wien Floridsdorf - Gänserndorf
 Mödling Wien Meidling - Wien Hauptbahnhof - Wien Mitte - Wien Floridsdorf - Wolkersdorf - Mistelbach - Laa an der Thaya
 Wiener Neustadt Hbf - Baden - Mödling - Wien Meidling - Wien Hauptbahnhof - Wien Mitte - Wien Floridsdorf - Stockerau - Hollabrunn
 Wiener Neustadt Hbf - Baden - Mödling - Wien Meidling - Wien Hauptbahnhof - Wien Mitte - Wien Floridsdorf - Stockerau - Absdorf-Hippersdorf - Tullnerfeld
 Laa an der Thaya - Mistelbach - Wolkersdorf - Wien Floridsdorf - Wien Mitte - Wien Rennweg - Flughafen Wien (Vienna Airport) - Wolfsthal
 Wien Mitte - Flughafen Wien (Vienna Airport) at 30-minute intervals

U-Bahn
Landstraße U-Bahn station is serviced by both U3 and U4 and has 4 platforms. U4 goes north and south of the station whilst U3 goes west and south-east.

 Ottakring - Westbahnhof - Volkstheater - Stephansplatz - Landstraße - Simmering
 Hütteldorf - Längenfeldgasse - Karlsplatz - Landstraße - Schwedenplatz - Schottenring - Spittelau - Heiligenstadt

References

External links

 Projekt Wien Mitte 
 Einkaufszentrum Wien Mitte, the shopping centre at the station 

Buildings and structures in Landstraße
Mitte
Railway stations in Austria opened in 1859